King's Park railway station is a railway station serving the King's Park and Simshill areas of Glasgow, Scotland. It is located on the Newton branch of the Cathcart Circle Line, which was electrified by British Railways in 1962. Services are provided by ScotRail on behalf of Strathclyde Partnership for Transport.

The Up (Kirkhill bound) platform is signalled for bi-directional running to enable Up trains to depart in the Down direction. In the past this has been used for trains from Langside to depart to Muirend on the Neilston Line. Nowadays trains only depart the 'wrong way' from this platform during times of disruption.

At time of electrification there was also an Up Loop, used for stabling Football Specials serving events at the nearby Hampden Park football stadium, although by the mid 1970s this had been lifted.

Services 

There is a half-hourly service each day (including Sundays) towards Glasgow Central - one via  and one via  northbound, and to Newton southbound.

References

External links 

Railway stations in Glasgow
Former London, Midland and Scottish Railway stations
Railway stations in Great Britain opened in 1928
SPT railway stations
Railway stations served by ScotRail